Abaza is a surname.

In Russian, the surname "" (Abaza) was first recorded among noble families in 1843. It derives from Turkish abaza, meaning stupid, which was originally adopted as a nickname and then morphed into a surname. However, in a Circassian context, the Abazin people's "self-designation" Abaza is separate from this Russian/Turkish origin. The word is also the name of this people's language and of an Egyptian noble family from the same origin.

The following people share this surname:
Abaza clan, Egypt's largest aristocratic family, of Abazin Cicassian origins
Alexander Abaza (1821–1895), Russian finance minister
Alexander Nikolayevich Abaza (1872–1925), Russian diplomat
Alexey Abaza (1853–1915), Russian admiral
Arkady Abaza (1843–1915), Russian composer
Fekry Abaza (1896–1979), Egyptian journalist and political activist
Jan Abaza (b. 1995), American tennis player
Rushdy Abaza (1926–1980), Egyptian actor
Tharwat Abaza (1927–2002), Egyptian journalist and novelist
Yanal Abaza (b. 1976), retired Syrian association football player

References

Notes

Sources
Н. А. Баскаков (N. A. Baskakov). "Русские фамилии тюркского происхождения" (Russian Last Name of Turkic Origin). Изд. "Наука", главная редакция восточной литературы. Москва, 1979.

Arabic-language surnames
Russian-language surnames